Air Marshal Sir Albert Durston,  (19 June 1894 – 24 January 1959) was a senior Royal Air Force (RAF) officer who served as Deputy Chief of the Air Staff from 1945 to 1946.

RAF career
Durston joined the Royal Navy in 1913 and served in the Royal Naval Air Service during the First World War. He was mentioned in despatches for services in home waters in 1917, and appointed Officer Commanding No. 253 Squadron in June 1918. In 1936 he was appointed Fleet Aviation Officer to the Commander-in-Chief of the Home Fleet. He served in the Second World War as Director of Naval Co-operation and then as Air Officer Commanding No. 18 Group. He continued his war service as Senior Air Staff Officer at Headquarters RAF Coastal Command and then as Air Officer Commanding No. 222 Group. His last appointment was as Deputy Chief of the Air Staff from September 1945 until retiring in August 1946.

References

|-

1894 births
1959 deaths
Companions of the Order of the Bath
Knights Commander of the Order of the British Empire
Recipients of the Air Force Cross (United Kingdom)
Royal Air Force air marshals of World War II
Royal Naval Air Service aviators
Royal Naval Air Service personnel of World War I
Royal Navy officers